The 2nd Guards Brigade, also known by their nickname Thunders (Gromovi), was one of the original Croatian National Guard (ZNG) brigades formed in 1991 and one of the most elite mechanized infantry units in the Croatian Ground Army (HV) during its existence, during which it saw action in a number of engagements during the War of Independence (1991–1995).

As part of the large reorganization of the Croatian Armed Forces in the late 2000s the brigade was officially disbanded in March 2008, reduced to a battalion-sized unit stationed in Petrinja and incorporated into the Motorized Guard Brigade. The present-day battalion still uses the original brigade's nickname and emblem.

History
The brigade was formed on 15 May 1991 at the Trstenik barracks near Dugo Selo, where the brigade command was established and the brigade's 1st infantry battalion was formed. The brigade was initially composed of members who joined from the Interior Ministry's special operations units based at Lučko, Rakitje, Kumrovec, Vinica, Sisak and Karlovac in northern Croatia, as it was originally formed within the Interior Ministry's framework as part of the ZNG, which later evolved into the Croatian Ground Army.

The 2nd battalion was formed on 3 June 1991 in Sisak, and the 3rd battalion was formed on 21 June 1991 in Duga Resa.

The Thunders' first engagement was in early June 1991 on the Mladost Bridge in Zagreb when they stopped the advance of the Yugoslav People's Army (JNA) tanks in the initial stages of the Battle of the Barracks. Over the course of the War of Independence elements of the brigade saw action in Central Croatia and Banovina regions. The brigade also took part in the Siege of Dubrovnik (Operation Tiger) and in operations in the Posavina region in northern Bosnia. They were also actively involved in Operation Maslenica, Operation Flash, Operation Storm and Operation Una.

During the war, 203 members of the brigade were killed in action, and 5 were missing as of 2013.

On 1 May 1996 the 81st Guards Battalion based in Virovitica was incorporated into the brigade and in 2003 the 2nd Guards Brigade was merged with the 7th "Pumas" Brigade.

See also
Croatian National Guard

References

Military units and formations established in 1991
Military units and formations disestablished in 2008
Brigades of Croatia
Military units and formations of the Croatian War of Independence
Order of Duke Domagoj recipients
Order of Nikola Šubić Zrinski recipients
1991 establishments in Croatia